The Champlain Housing Trust is a membership-based  nonprofit, non governmental organization which creates and preserves affordable housing in northwest Vermont. As of 2019 the Champlain Housing Trust is the largest Community Land Trust in the United States.

History
The Burlington Community Land Trust and Lake Champlain Housing Development Corporation were each founded by the City of Burlington, Vermont in 1984 to provide affordable, safe housing to families and individuals with low to moderate incomes. As geographic territory, services, and funding sources increasingly overlapped, the two organizations decided to combine their assets and resources into Champlain Housing Trust. In 2006, the merger was complete.

In 2009, the organization moved headquarters on King Street. Besides containing the staff, the building has room for 20 families.

Organization
In 2009, there were 80 staff members located throughout Chittenden, Grand Isle, and Franklin counties.

Assets

In 2009, the trust had $43 million in assets, nearly 1,500 apartments, 440 owner-occupied homes, and 15 commercial buildings. As of 2018 the Champlain Housing Trust's assets were valued at $144 million, with more than 6,000 people sleeping in CHT properties every night.

Footnotes 

Organizations based in Burlington, Vermont
Non-profit organizations based in Vermont
Housing organizations in the United States
Organizations established in 1984
Affordable housing